The year 1863 in science and technology involved some significant events, listed below.

Chemistry
 August 1 – Friedrich Bayer founds the chemical manufacturing company of Bayer at Barmen in Germany.
 Teerfarbenfabrik Meister, Lucius & Co. of Höchst (Frankfurt) in Germany produce a green dye from coal tar.

Cryptography
 German military officer Friedrich Kasiski publishes Die Geheimschriften und die Dechiffrir-Kunst ("Secret writing and the Art of Deciphering"), the first published general method for cryptanalysis of polyalphabetic ciphers, especially the Vigenère cipher.

Life sciences
 August 7 – Amalie Dietrich arrives in Australia to begin a decade of collecting specimens in natural history and anthropology.
 Max Schultze advances cell theory with the observation that animal and vegetable protoplasm are identical.
 The first outbreak of phylloxera on the European mainland is observed, in the vineyards of the southern Rhône region of France.
 Henry Walter Bates publishes The Naturalist on the River Amazons.

Medicine
 February 17 – First meeting of what will become the International Committee of the Red Cross is held in Geneva, Switzerland, following the lead of humanitarian Henry Dunant.
 William Banting publishes Letter on Corpulence, Addressed to the Public in London, the first popular low-carbohydrate diet.
 Ivan Sechenov publishes Refleksy golovnogo mozga ("Reflexes of the brain").

Meteorology
 The Paris Observatory begins to publish weather maps.

Paleontology
 Richard Owen publishes the first description of a fossilised bird, Archaeopteryx.

Physics
 January – John Tyndall first explains the workings of the greenhouse effect.

Technology
 February 10 – Alanson Crane patents a fire extinguisher.
 Spring – John Jonathon Pratt builds a practical form of typewriter in the United States.
 July – The tiny Confederate States of America hand-propelled submarine H. L. Hunley is first tested successfully (although thirteen crew – including her inventor Horace Lawson Hunley – are lost in two sinkings later in the year).
 October 23 – The Ffestiniog Railway in North Wales introduces steam locomotives into general service, the first time this has been done anywhere in the world on a public railway of such a narrow gauge (2 ft (60 cm)).
 December 19 – Linoleum patented in the United Kingdom.
 John W. Murphy builds a Whipple-type truss bridge across the Lehigh River at Mauch Chunk for the Lehigh Valley Railroad in the United States, the first known to have both tension and compression members in wrought iron.

Events and institutions
 March 3 – National Academy of Sciences incorporated in the United States.
 Summer – The Chōshū Five leave Japan secretly to study Western science and technology in Britain, at University College London, part of the ending of sakoku.
 November 29 – Polytechnic University of Milan founded as the Istituto Tecnico Superiore.

Publications
 January 31 – The first of Jules Verne's scientifically inspired Voyages Extraordinaires, the novel Cinq semaines en ballon (Five Weeks in a Balloon), is published in Paris.

Awards
 Copley Medal: Adam Sedgwick
 Wollaston Medal for Geology: Gustav Bischof

Births
 March 25 – Simon Flexner (d. 1946), American pathologist and bacteriologist.
 April 7 – André Rochon-Duvigneaud (d. 1952), French ophthalmologist.
 April 29 – Signe Häggman (d. 1911), Finnish pioneer of physical education of the disabled. 
 May 14 – John Charles Fields (d. 1932), Canadian mathematician.
 July 12
 Albert Calmette (d. 1933), French physician, bacteriologist and immunologist.
 Paul Drude (d. 1906), German physicist.
 October 16 – Beverly Thomas Galloway (d. 1938), American plant pathologist.
 November 25 – Ioan Cantacuzino (d. 1934), Romanian microbiologist.
 December 5 – Paul Painlevé (d. 19333), mathematician and statesman, 62nd Prime Minister of France.
 December 11 – Annie Jump Cannon (d. 1941), American astronomer and academic.
 Undated – Cuthbert Christy (d. 1932), English medical investigator, zoologist and explorer.

Deaths
 March 7 – Charles Wilkins Short (b. 1794), American botanist.
 June 25 – Thomas Evans Blackwell (b. 1819), English civil and hydraulic engineer.
 July 21 – Josephine Kablick (b. 1787), Czech botanist and paleontologist.
 December 8 – Jacques Etienne Chevalley de Rivaz  (b. 1801), Swiss-born physician

References

 
Science, 1863 In
1860s in science
19th century in science